1975 in sports describes the year's events in world sport.

Alpine skiing
 Alpine Skiing World Cup
 Men's overall season champion: Gustav Thöni, Italy
 Women's overall season champion: Annemarie Pröll, Austria

American football
 January 12 − Super Bowl IX: the Pittsburgh Steelers (AFC) won 16−6 over the Minnesota Vikings (NFC)
 Location: Tulane Stadium
 Attendance: 80,997
 MVP: Franco Harris, FB (Pittsburgh)
 Birmingham Vulcans win the final season of WFL competition, had best overall record when league ceased after first twelve weeks of regular season.

Association football
 Brazil – Internacional wins the Campeonato Brasileiro
 England – the League Championship – Derby County took the title for the second time in four seasons, finishing two points clear of Liverpool and Ipswich Town.
 England – FA Cup – West Ham United beat Fulham 2–0 at Wembley Stadium in front of 100,000 people. Alan Taylor was the scorer of both goals.
 England – League Cup – Aston Villa beat Norwich City 1–0 at Wembley Stadium.
 European Cup – Bayern Munich defeated Leeds United 2–0 in a controversial final at the Parc des Princes, Paris.
 European Cup Winners' Cup – Dynamo Kiev beat Ferencváros 3–0 in Basle, Switzerland.
 UEFA Cup – Borussia Mönchengladbach beat FC Twente 5–1 on aggregate, with a leg played at each team's home stadium.
 Ecuador – Ecuadorian Serie A Champions: Liga Deportiva Universitaria de Quito

Athletics
 August 12 – New Zealand's John Walker set a new world record in Gothenburg, Sweden, becoming the first man to break 3:50 for the mile when he clocked 3:49.4.
 October – Athletics at the 1975 Pan American Games held in Mexico City

Australian rules football
 Victorian Football League
 North Melbourne wins the 79th VFL Premiership (North Melbourne 19.8 (122) d Hawthorn 9.13 (67))
 Brownlow Medal awarded to Gary Dempsey (Footscray)
 South Australian National Football League:
 August 23: Glenelg kick the all-time record score for a major Australian Rules competition, kicking 49.23 (317) to Central District's 11.13 (79). It beat the previous record by an amazing 91 points.

Baseball
 January 23 – Slugger Ralph Kiner is inducted into the Baseball Hall of Fame.
 September 16 – Pirates second baseman Rennie Stennett ties Wilbert Robinson's ML record, set June 10, 1892, by going 7-for-7 in a 9-inning game. He scored five of his club's runs in a 22–0 massacre of the Cubs, a major-league record for the biggest score in a shutout game in the 20th century.
 World Series – Cincinnati Reds win 4 games to 3 over the Boston Red Sox.  Often described as one of the most memorable of all World Series.

Basketball
 April 9 – Asia's first professional basketball league, the Philippine Basketball Association played its first game at the Araneta Coliseum.
 Darryl Dawkins becomes the first NBA player drafted out of high school.
 NCAA Division I Men's Basketball Championship –
 UCLA wins 92–85 over Kentucky in John Wooden's final game as Bruins coach.
 NBA Finals –
 Golden State Warriors win 4 games to 0 over the Washington Bullets
 1975 ABA Finals –
 Kentucky Colonels defeat Indiana Pacers 4 games to 1

Boxing
 October 1 in Manila, Philippines Muhammad Ali defeated Joe Frazier to maintain the Heavyweight Championship of the world. Known as the Thrilla In Manila, many regard it as the greatest fight in boxing history.

Canadian football
 Grey Cup – Edmonton Eskimos won 9–8 over the Montreal Alouettes
 Vanier Cup – Ottawa Gee-Gees won 14–9 over the Calgary Dinos

Cricket
 1975 Cricket World Cup, the first to be held. West Indies beat Australia by 17 runs.

Cycling
 Giro d'Italia won by Fausto Bertoglio of Italy
 Tour de France – Bernard Thévenet of France
 UCI Road World Championships – Men's road race – Hennie Kuiper of Netherlands

Disc sports
 The first disc ultimate games in Canada are played as exhibition games at the Canadian Open Frisbee Championships on Toronto Islands.
 Ultimate is played as an exhibition of a new sport at the World Frisbee Championships (WFC) at the Rose Bowl in Pasadena, California.

Dogsled racing
 Iditarod Trail Sled Dog Race Champion –
 Emmitt Peters won with lead dogs: Nugget & Digger

Field hockey
 Men's World Cup held in Kuala Lumpur and won by India
 1975 Pan American Games men's competition held in Mexico City and won by Argentina

Figure skating
 World Figure Skating Championships –
 Men's champion: Sergey Nikolayevich Volkov, Soviet Union
 Ladies' champion: Dianne de Leeuw, Netherlands
 Pair skating champions: Irina Rodnina & Alexander Zaitsev, Soviet Union
 Ice dancing champions: Irina Moiseyeva & Andrei Minenkov, Soviet Union

Golf
Men's professional
 Masters Tournament – Jack Nicklaus
 U.S. Open – Lou Graham
 British Open – Tom Watson
 PGA Championship – Jack Nicklaus
 PGA Tour money leader – Jack Nicklaus – $298,149
 Ryder Cup – United States wins 21–11 over Britain & Ireland in team golf.
Men's amateur
 British Amateur – Vinny Giles
 U.S. Amateur – Fred Ridley
Women's professional
 LPGA Championship – Kathy Whitworth
 U.S. Women's Open – Sandra Palmer
 LPGA Tour money leader – Sandra Palmer – $76,374

Harness racing
 United States Pacing Triple Crown races –
 Cane Pace – Nero
 Little Brown Jug – Seatrain
 Messenger Stakes – Bret's Champ
 United States Trotting Triple Crown races –
 Hambletonian – Bonefish
 Yonkers Trot – Surefire Hanover
 Kentucky Futurity – Noble Rogue
 Australian Inter Dominion Harness Racing Championship –
 Pacers: Young Quinn

Horse racing
 footy July 6 – In what was billed as the "Battle of the Sexes", Kentucky Derby winner, Foolish Pleasure went head to head in a match race against the undefeated filly, Ruffian. In the lead, Ruffian broke a leg and, after an unsuccessful operation to save her, the horse widely believed to have been the greatest thoroughbred filly ever was humanely put down.
Steeplechases
 Cheltenham Gold Cup – Ten Up
 Grand National – L'Escargot
Flat races
 Australia – Melbourne Cup won by Think Big
 Canada – Queen's Plate won by L'Enjoleur
 France – Prix de l'Arc de Triomphe won by Star Appeal
 Ireland – Irish Derby Stakes won by Grundy
 English Triple Crown Races:
 2,000 Guineas Stakes – Bolkonski
 The Derby – Grundy
 St. Leger Stakes – Bruni
 United States Triple Crown Races:
 Kentucky Derby – Foolish Pleasure
 Preakness Stakes – Master Derby
 Belmont Stakes – Avatar

Ice hockey
 Art Ross Trophy as the NHL's leading scorer during the regular season: Bobby Orr, Boston Bruins.
 Hart Memorial Trophy for the NHL's Most Valuable Player: Bobby Clarke, Philadelphia Flyers
 Stanley Cup – Philadelphia Flyers defeat the Buffalo Sabres 4 games to 2
 World Hockey Championship –
 Men's champion: Soviet Union defeated Czechoslovakia
 Avco World Trophy – Houston Aeros win 4 games to 0 over the Quebec Nordiques
 SM-liiga, the Finnish professional ice hockey league, launched its first season 1975–1976
 NCAA Men's Ice Hockey Championship – Michigan Technological University Huskies defeat University of Minnesota-Twin Cities Golden Gophers 6–1 in St. Louis, Missouri

Lacrosse
 The National Lacrosse League of 1974 and 1975 play their 2nd and last season.
 The Quebec Caribous defeat the Montreal Québécois 4 games to 2 to win the National Lacrosse League (1974–75) Championship.
 The Vancouver Burrards win the Mann Cup.
 The Windsor Warlocks win the Founders Cup.
 The Peterborough Gray Munros win the Minto Cup.

Motorsport

Orienteering
 First Ski Orienteering World Championships held in Hyvinkää, Finland.

Rugby league
1975 Amco Cup
1975 European Rugby League Championship
1975 New Zealand rugby league season
1975 NSWRFL season
1975 Pacific Cup
1974–75 Northern Rugby Football League season / 1975–76 Northern Rugby Football League season
1975 Rugby League World Cup

Rugby union
 81st Five Nations Championship series is won by Wales

Snooker
 World Snooker Championship – Ray Reardon beats Eddie Charlton 31-30

Swimming
 The second FINA World Championships held in Cali, Colombia

Tennis
 Grand Slam in tennis men's results:
 Australian Open – John Newcombe
 French Open – Björn Borg
 Wimbledon championships – Arthur Ashe
 U.S. Open – Manuel Orantes
 Grand Slam in tennis women's results:
 Australian Open – Evonne Goolagong
 French Open – Chris Evert
 Wimbledon championships – Billie Jean King
 U.S. Open – Chris Evert
 Davis Cup – Sweden wins 3–2 over Czechoslovakia in world tennis.
 Eighteen-year-old Martina Navratilova of Czechoslovakia announces her defection to the United States

Volleyball
 Asian Men's Volleyball Championship held in Melbourne: won by Japan
 Asian Women's Volleyball Championship held in Melbourne: won by Japan
 Men and Women's European Volleyball Championship held in Yugoslavia: men's and women's tournaments both won by USSR
 Volleyball at the 1975 Pan American Games held in Mexico City: men's and women's tournaments both won by Cuba

Water polo
 1975 FINA Men's World Water Polo Championship held in Cali, Colombia, and won by USSR.

General sporting events
 Seventh Pan American Games held in Mexico City, Mexico
 Seventh Mediterranean Games held in Algiers, Algeria
 Eighth Summer Universiade held in Rome, Italy
 Eighth Winter Universiade held in Livigno, Italy

Awards
 Associated Press Male Athlete of the Year – Fred Lynn, Major League Baseball
 Associated Press Female Athlete of the Year – Chris Evert, Tennis

References

 
Sports by year